KCPQ (channel 13) is a television station licensed to Tacoma, Washington, United States, serving as the Fox network outlet for the Seattle area. It is owned and operated by the network's Fox Television Stations division alongside MyNetworkTV station KZJO (channel 22). The two stations share studios on Westlake Avenue in Seattle's Westlake neighborhood; KCPQ's main transmitter is located on Gold Mountain in Bremerton.

The station signed on in August 1953 as KMO-TV, the adjunct to Tacoma radio station KMO. It was briefly a network affiliate until another Seattle station signed on; the next year, KMO radio and television were sold to separate owners. The buyer for channel 13 was Seattle broadcaster J. Elroy McCaw, who changed the call letters to KTVW and ran it as an independent station. While KTVW produced a number of local programs, McCaw, a famously parsimonious owner, never converted the station to broadcast in color, and its syndicated programming inventory was considered meager. McCaw died in August 1969; three years later, his estate sold the station to the Blaidon Mutual Investors Corporation. While Blaidon tried several new programs and began color telecasting, the station continued to underperform financially. Two attempts to sell KTVW to out-of-state buyers failed because of its high liabilities. After a walkout by employees by January and the appointment of a receiver in July, KTVW was ordered closed on December 12, 1974.

The Clover Park School District in Lakewood purchased KTVW at bankruptcy auction in 1975. The station returned to the air on a non-commercial basis as KCPQ in January 1976, serving as an effective replacement for Clover Park's UHF station, KPEC-TV (channel 56). However, changes to the structure of school financing in Washington and the refusal of voters to approve bonds to rebuild Clover Park High School forced the school district to sell KCPQ back into commercial use. After being off the air for most of 1980 to relocate its transmitter, KCPQ returned under new owner Kelly Broadcasting, who rebuilt the station as a competitive independent. During Kelly's 19-year ownership of KCPQ, the station became a Fox affiliate; relocated its studios from Lakewood to Seattle; and established its present local news department.

KCPQ was sold to Tribune Broadcasting in 1999 as part of Kelly's exit from the broadcasting industry. As Tribune expanded the station's news output, it also had to fend off overtures by Fox, which had coveted owning the station since the 1990s and at one point threatened to buy another station to broadcast Fox programming. Tribune was purchased by Nexstar Media Group in 2019; Nexstar then traded KCPQ to Fox as part of an exchange of Fox affiliates in three cities.

History

As KMO-TV/KTVW
In December 1952, the Federal Communications Commission (FCC) simultaneously granted applications for VHF channels 11 and 13 in Tacoma; channel 13 was awarded to radio station KMO (1360 AM). The station began broadcasting as KMO-TV on August 2, 1953, from studios in Tacoma and a transmitter near Ruston.

KMO-TV briefly carried NBC programs until Seattle's KOMO-TV began broadcasting on December 11. After that, KMO-TV's output primarily consisted of local and syndicated programs. Within a year of starting the TV station, after 27 years of broadcasting dating to the launch of KMO radio, owner Carl E. Haymond sought to exit the business, having sold stakes in radio stations in California and Arizona. He first attempted to sell KMO radio and television together to the owners of Seattle radio station KAYO (1150 AM) for $350,000 (equivalent to $ in  dollars); the unusually low purchase price was attributed to the station's lack of network affiliation and financial losses. However, the FCC warned that it appeared it would need to hold a hearing to approve the sale due to the then-impermissible overlap of the Seattle and Tacoma radio stations' coverage areas; the deal was then scrapped several weeks later. Two months later, Haymond sold KMO-TV for $300,000 (equivalent to $ in  dollars) to J. Elroy McCaw, a Seattle-based radio station owner.

With KMO-TV separated from KMO radio, the television station changed its call sign to KTVW in October 1954 and announced plans to open auxiliary offices in Seattle. The station also began airing Seattle Americans minor-league hockey, with which several of its principals had connections. For two months, KTVW's general manager served as president of the team; when he resigned for a television job in Los Angeles, McCaw became the team's sole owner. At this time, the Americans were the only professional hockey club to televise all their home games.

McCaw tried to make several moves in the late 1950s. In an unusual arrangement, the station briefly aired the CBS network news in late 1957 when Tacoma's then-CBS affiliate, KTNT-TV (channel 11), dropped the CBS Evening News with Douglas Edwards to make way for an expanded local news program. CBS, which wanted the newscast to continue to air in the Seattle market until KIRO-TV could sign on as the market's CBS station (which it would do on February 8, 1958), arranged for the network hookup to bring the program to KTVW on an interim basis. In 1957, McCaw filed to move the transmitter from Tacoma to Queen Anne Hill in Seattle, which would have come with an upgrade to the maximum 316,000 watts; local residents objected to the erection of another TV tower in the area and to McCaw's proposal to create a "tower park" that would have required the demolition of 75 to 80 homes. This proposal had stalled out by 1958, when it was reported that the owners of Los Angeles station KCOP-TV, including Bing Crosby, were negotiating to buy KTVW and another independent station McCaw owned, Denver's KTVR. Ultimately, the station increased its effective radiated power from the Ruston transmitter to 214,000 watts in 1960.

McCaw was regarded as a penny-pincher. Of his Denver station, it was remarked by Edwin James of Broadcasting that "McCaw's saving ways had been reflected in the station's programming". Local programs from KTVW during its 20-year run included a movie block hosted by Stu Martin; the afternoon children's show Penny and Her Pals, hosted by LeMoyne Hreha; and, for one year, coverage of the Seafair hydroplane races. In 1967, when an engineer's strike kept most of the other Seattle stations from broadcasting the event, KTVW stepped in to fill the void; on short notice, Pat O'Day was called in to do commentary, starting a 46-year streak of announcing the races for various radio and television outlets. In 1967, channel 13 began airing a six-hour stock market show, the first such program to broadcast on a VHF station. These shows, along with most of channel 13's local programming, were temporarily suspended at the end of March 1970 as part of cutbacks it attributed to "the economic slowdown". The cutbacks left Bob Corcoran, a talk show host, as KTVW's sole on-air personality. KTVW was left airing, in the words of the television editor of The Seattle Times, "scratchy old movies and ... Neanderthal reruns from the violence-action era of television". The business news programming briefly left the air that April.

In the spring of 1969, plans were floated to convert KTVW to color, move the transmitter to Port Orchard, and relocate the studios to Seattle. The television editor of the Seattle Post-Intelligencer hailed the proposed changes as heralding the end of "the funny station way over at the end of your television dial ... with the fuzzy picture and the funny, fuzzy programs and the fuzzy, old, awful movies". However, any hopes of an upgrade were dashed when McCaw died of a stroke that August. His indebted businesses fell into a tailspin after his death; creditors made more than $12 million (equivalent to $ in  dollars) in claims, after which the bank declared his estate insolvent, requiring the family to sell off his various holdings, including the family mansion and yachts.

Blaidon ownership, financial woes, and the end of KTVW
After nearly three years, on March 27, 1972, McCaw's estate sold KTVW to Seattle-based Blaidon Mutual Investors Corporation, named for co-owners Blaine Sampson and Don Wolfstone, for $1.1 million (equivalent to $ in  dollars). During the sale process, the stock market program—which had returned in 1971 after it reorganized under a new production company—stopped airing after channel 13 asked for more money for its air time in contract negotiations.

Wolfstone recognized that the station needed help if it were to become viable, telling a writer for the Seattle Post-Intelligencer that "there's not much of a worse [station] in the country". Blaidon tried to turn KTVW around by boosting the station's signal strength, acquiring first-run syndicated programming, and installing color-capable broadcast equipment (the station had broadcast exclusively in black-and-white until Blaidon bought it). Channel 13 premiered its new programming lineup with The Tony Visco Show, its flagship effort. This talk/entertainment show attempted to recreate a Tonight Show-style program hosted by Las Vegas lounge entertainer/singer Tony Visco. Don Wolfstone—the "Don" in "Blaidon"—brought in a Los Angeles producer/director to develop the show, which featured a live band on-set, and had hopes of flying in show-business guests from L.A. and later syndicating the program nationwide. After two months on-air, rising production costs forced Blaidon to relocate the program from a Tacoma restaurant to the station's studios; channel 13 canceled The Tony Visco Show before the year ended. Another new program launched under Blaidon was an afternoon cartoon show hosted by local actor Mike Lynch, playing a "superhero" character for whom viewers were asked to suggest a name; the winning entry was "Flash Blaidon".

Despite KTVW's improved and sometimes innovative programming and even ratings that at times were competitive with KTNT-TV, national advertisers failed to materialize. The News Tribune described the station, in retrospect, as "a down-at-the-heels purveyor of old movies and used-car commercials".

At the end of 1973, Blaidon filed to sell channel 13 to the Christian Broadcasting Network (CBN) of Portsmouth, Virginia; the filing alone signaled trouble, given that at the time, the FCC barred selling a station in less than three years of ownership unless the buyer demonstrated it was facing financial hardship. The station's remaining live programming, such as Flash Blaidon, was canceled. Over the course of 1974, KTVW's financial position deteriorated. On January 15, 40 employees staged a walk-out, forcing the station to go off the air, complaining about not having been paid in nearly four weeks. After they were paid by cashier's check, channel 13 resumed operations the next day, but employees remained skeptical of Blaidon's financial condition. By the end of January, Blaidon had pleaded with the FCC to expedite approval of the CBN transfer; president Don Wolfstone expected the Internal Revenue Service to lock up his offices for failing to pay withholding taxes in the second half of 1973.

The FCC approved the CBN transaction, but the buyer had second thoughts about the $5.1 million (equivalent to $ in  dollars) purchase price of channel 13 and asked for several time extensions to consummate the purchase. In July, MCA Television, among KTVW's largest creditors, successfully petitioned for the appointment of a receiver to manage the station's affairs. Despite a brief improvement in financial position when the receiver separated KTVW from Blaidon, the CBN sale fell apart over its refusal to assume all of the television station's liabilities.

The bankruptcy court approved a second offer from the Suburban Broadcasting Company, which owned WSNL in Patchogue, New York, but this deal collapsed, as Suburban also refused to assume the station's liabilities. As a result, court-appointed trustee Bruce Clements decided he had seen enough. On the afternoon of December 12, 1974, at 5:10 p.m., KTVW was airing a rerun of Batman when he ordered the station to go off the air at 5:30 upon that program completing its airing.

By the end of January 1975, the bankruptcy court was entertaining two "very firm offers" for the station. In 1976, the U.S. Securities and Exchange Commission sued Blaidon, alleging that they had sold stock to non-Washington residents without SEC approval and issued misleading financial reports to prospective investors in the company.

KCPQ: The Clover Park years

When the bankruptcy court revealed the identity of the winning bidder for channel 13's transmission site—the studio equipment having been sold at a sheriff's sale—the local television community was shocked to learn that the buyer would be the Clover Park School District. Clover Park had operated KPEC-TV, an educational station on channel 56, since April 1960; it was one of the South Sound's two public TV stations, alongside KTPS-TV (channel 62), owned by Tacoma Public Schools. However, by 1975, the UHF equipment that had been in service more than a decade was aging and needed replacement, and it was more cost-effective to replace the channel 56 physical plant with KTVW, a high-power VHF station that could reach more western Washington homes and schools. A booster group for KTPS, the fledgling Trinity Broadcasting Network, and a commercial group headed by Tacoma Twins manager Stan Naccarato also bid.

Clover Park won the station for a final cost of $378,000 (equivalent to $ in  dollars), with KSTW (the former KTNT-TV) owner Gaylord Broadcasting providing $250,000 of that total in what was viewed as a move to make KSTW the only independent in the market. Transmitter testing took place in November 1975, with channel 13 repeating the KPEC-TV signal; eventually, a new microwave link would be used to feed programming from channel 56's existing studios to the channel 13 transmitter near Ruston. The call letters were changed to KCPQ-TV and the license modified to noncommercial before channel 13 returned to the air on January 4, 1976; the microwave link was not ready, so KPEC-TV remained in service until it was. The new KCPQ also aired some programming produced by KTPS.

Programming in the Clover Park era, which included PBS material, represented a continuation of KPEC-TV's former service and originated from its existing Lakewood studios. The transmitter upgrade also attracted a high-profile name: Jim Harriott, who had been the highest-paid anchor in local TV news at KING-TV and who took a pay cut to come to channel 13 and helm public affairs programming. Harriott soon left when KIRO-TV offered him a job.

From Clover Park to Kelly
KPEC-TV had turned a profit prior to the channel 13 move, a rarity among educational TV stations. However, two simultaneous events in 1978 prompted the district to reconsider its ownership of a television station. The Washington State Legislature—which KPEC-TV and later KCPQ covered for the state's public television stations—approved plans to fully fund basic education at the state level, which would change channel 13 into a financial drain on the school system. For instance, Clover Park would stop receiving federal funds that accrued to it for educating military dependents to the tune of $3.5 million a year; this money would instead go to the state, making the $600,000 in annual station maintenance costs (equivalent to $ in  dollars) a "luxury". Meanwhile, portions of Clover Park High School were condemned, but voters rejected four separate bond initiatives that would have funded the reconstruction of the high school and taken students out of portable classrooms. The school board stated that annual losses from operating KCPQ reached $500,000.

In late 1978, the Clover Park School District received a $6 million offer from two investors from Tucson, Arizona: Gene Adelstein and Edward Berger, owners of that city's independent KZAZ-TV. Adelstein and Berger were looking to expand; already in the early stages of a bid to build a new station in Albuquerque, New Mexico, the pair saw the Seattle–Tacoma market as having recovered from the market conditions that claimed KTVW four years prior and as being overserved by educational stations. They also felt that the Tacoma area alone represented a market of similar size to Tucson. Channel 13, however, attracted another buyer who topped the Adelstein–Berger bid. In January 1979, the school board accepted an offer from Kelly Broadcasting, owners of KCRA-TV in Sacramento, California, to buy KCPQ from the Clover Park School District for $6.25 million (equivalent to $ in  dollars). This purchase price was financed by Kelly Broadcasting's sale, earlier that year, of two radio stations in Sacramento.

The sale was met with stiff protests and a petition to deny led by members of the station's advisory board, organized as "Save our Station 13". After the approval of a settlement between this group and Kelly that included a $450,000 gift (equivalent to $ in  dollars) from the buyer for public television and the donation of the Ruston tower to KTPS, KCPQ ceased educational broadcasting on February 29, 1980, and the station went silent for a major technical overhaul. While KCPQ would continue to use Clover Park's studio space, the transmitter was relocated to Gold Mountain, a peak located west of Bremerton, where the station erected a new tower; this enabled channel 13 to increase its signal footprint across western Washington.

After more than eight months and several delays, KCPQ returned to the air—and to commercial operation as the Seattle market's second independent station—on November 4, 1980, when it adopted the Q13 moniker (it was also called "The New 13" early on); on opening night, it counterprogrammed election returns on the network affiliates with the movie The Deer Hunter. Channel 13 represented a challenge that brought Bob Kelly, who with his brother had owned KCRA, out of semiretirement; disenchanted with network television, he had turned his attention to other Kelly family ventures. Among the new KCPQ's launch programs were a nightly 8 p.m. movie, game shows, and a local children's show, Captain Sea-Tac. Political reporter John Komen was the only holdover from the public station's programming.

KCPQ grew quickly in its first five years. What started as a station heavy on movies and branded as "The Northwest Movie Channel" expanded to include a strong offering of college sports (including Washington and Washington State football) and even tried its hand at a full local newscast. When KSTW opted not to join the new Fox network in 1986, the affiliation went to KCPQ that June ahead of its launch on October 9; of the first 79 stations to affiliate with Fox, it was among the 13 on the VHF dial. In February 1990, KCPQ signed a three-year deal with Buena Vista Television to carry The Disney Afternoon, spurning Fox's own children's lineup which launched that fall. This led to a threat from Fox to strip KCPQ of its affiliation if it did not commit to running Fox Kids in sequence beginning in 1992, as well as an antitrust lawsuit between Buena Vista and Fox, which Buena Vista alleged was coercing affiliates to air its children's programming in a restraint of trade. Fox ultimately relented on its pressure, but KCPQ dropped the Disney Afternoon block in the fall of 1993.

The winds of change
The second half of the 1990s would be a time of major changes at channel 13. In 1995, Kelly Broadcasting bought a former candy factory on Westlake Avenue along Lake Union in Seattle which would be renovated and expanded to house KCPQ's operations. Even though Bob Kelly lived in Tacoma, the company made the decision to move out of the South Sound and into a space more than twice the size of the prior studio and closer to the bulk of market activity. On September 13, 1997, KCPQ moved its studios to the new, $30 million Seattle facility, retaining only a small sales office in the city of license of Tacoma. This marked the end of television broadcasting from the Clover Park studios after more than 20 years on channel 13 and more than 35 since the founding of KPEC-TV.

There were also changes in ownership. In 1997, Kelly Broadcasting experienced an internal changing of the guard, as Bob Kelly and his son Chris sold their stakes in Kelly to family members Jon and Greg Kelly and KCPQ general manager Roger Ottenbach. Not long after, the family company decided to exit an increasingly consolidated television business. In August 1998, Kelly Broadcasting announced the sale of its Sacramento television business to Hearst-Argyle Television; the next day, it sold KCPQ to the Meredith Corporation, which immediately traded it to the Tribune Company in exchange for Tribune's Atlanta station, WGNX. The swap made sense for both companies; WGNX was the only CBS affiliate owned by Tribune, whose portfolio otherwise consisted of Fox and The WB affiliates, while Meredith owned several CBS outlets in top-25 markets. Following the purchase of channel 13, Tribune merged KCPQ's operations with those of KTWB-TV (channel 22, now KZJO), which Tribune had acquired the year prior; the two stations became co-owned in 1999, after the FCC began to allow same-market duopolies.

Fox covets Seattle

The size of the Seattle market and its status as an NFL football city led Fox to covet owning a station there. By 1997, it had already made two rejected offers to buy KCPQ.

KCPQ first came in danger of losing its Fox affiliation in February 1997, when Fox Television Stations was reported to be in negotiations to acquire then-UPN affiliate KIRO-TV from Belo Corporation. Belo had just acquired the Providence Journal Company and KING-TV, requiring it to dispose of KIRO. Fox was reportedly dissatisfied with KCPQ, which was described by one observer as being "recalcitrant". The trade with Belo never materialized; KIRO was ultimately sold to Cox Broadcasting.

In 2002, the Seattle Seahawks moved from the American Football Conference to the National Football Conference, to which Fox holds the rights for most games. In June 2014, Fox reached a deal with Cox to trade its stations in Boston and Memphis for Cox's Fox affiliate, KTVU, and associated independent KICU in San Francisco; Fox was also reportedly considering a deal to acquire KIRO, which would have displaced the Fox affiliation from KCPQ. In 2013, Fox had made a similar move in Charlotte, North Carolina (home market of the Carolina Panthers), exercising an option to buy WJZY and move its affiliation there.

In September 2014, the New York Post reported that Fox was planning to acquire KCPQ from Tribune in exchange for its Chicago MyNetworkTV station WPWR-TV—which would have created a duopoly with WGN-TV in that city. On September 23, Tribune announced that it had been notified by Fox that its affiliation with KCPQ would be terminated as of January 17, 2015, but that discussions between the two companies were still ongoing. Days earlier, on September 19, Fox had struck a deal to buy KBCB, a station in Bellingham, for $10 million; the purchase, submitted for FCC approval on October 3, was described as a "strategic option" for Fox by an insider. Naming KBCB as Fox's Seattle affiliate would have had immediate complications for Fox's distribution in the market, as the Bellingham station provides a marginal signal to Seattle proper. By the time the KBCB purchase was disclosed, talks between Tribune and Fox had deteriorated; a Wall Street Journal report on October 7 stated that Fox no longer planned to include WPWR in a potential swap for KCPQ.

On October 17, 2014, Fox announced that Tribune had agreed to extend its affiliation agreement for KCPQ through July 2018 and that it had agreed to pay increased reverse compensation fees to Fox for the broadcasting of its programming beginning in January 2015. Shortly thereafter, Fox's purchase of KBCB was abandoned and was dismissed by the FCC on November 20, 2014.

Aborted sale to Sinclair Broadcast Group

Tribune Media agreed to be sold to Sinclair Broadcast Group on May 8, 2017, for $3.9 billion and the assumption of $2.9 billion in debt held by Tribune. As Sinclair already owned KOMO-TV and KUNS-TV, KCPQ was one of 23 stations identified for divestment in order to meet regulatory compliance for the merger. Fox Television Stations agreed to purchase KCPQ as part of a $910 million deal with Sinclair; Howard Stirk Holdings additionally agreed to purchase KUNS-TV. After lead FCC commissioner Ajit Pai publicly rejected the deal after details of Sinclair's proposed divestitures came to light, Tribune terminated their merger with Sinclair on August 9, 2018, nullifying both transactions.

Sale to Nexstar and resale to Fox
Tribune Media agreed to be acquired by Nexstar Media Group for $6.9 billion in cash and debt on December 3, 2018. Following the merger's completion on September 19, 2019, Fox Television Stations purchased KCPQ and KZJO as part of a $350 million deal, with Fox citing KCPQ's status as the broadcaster of most Seahawks home games as the impetus for the transaction. The sale was completed on March 2, 2020. After its acquisition by Fox, KCPQ dropped the Q13 moniker and rebranded to "Fox 13" on September 26, 2021, conforming with the branding of other Fox-owned stations.

Local programming

Newscasts

The first local news service on channel 13 operated when the station was KMO-TV in 1953; the next time channel 13 tried its hand at a regular local newscast was in 1981, when the station aired regular news updates, expanding briefly by running a half-hour 10 p.m. newscast by the mid-1980s. This news operation could not compete with the more established 10 p.m. news on then-independent KSTW and was axed in June 1986 as part of economic cutbacks by the station.

In 1991, KIRO-TV proposed to produce a 10 p.m. program for KCPQ, but channel 13 "wasn't ready" for the venture, and KTZZ aired it instead, lasting until 1993. By 1997—as the Fox network had added a national news service and more of its affiliated stations were adding newscasts, and after KCPQ had relocated to the larger Seattle studios—KCPQ began planning to start up a newscast of its own. As a potential stopgap, KCPQ considered airing a 10 p.m. newscast from KIRO-TV, which at that time was preparing to switch back from UPN to CBS and was shopping the 10 p.m. hour to other local stations. While KCPQ reached an initial agreement to air the KIRO newscast for three years, minutes from signing the contract, an impasse was reached over a "deep philosophical issue": the length of the contract, because KCPQ wanted a term of no more than 18 months before it would start up its own newscast.

After no agreement could be reached with KIRO, Kelly decided to re-launch the station's news division (and newscast) independently and hired Todd Mokhtari, producer of KCRA-TV's morning and evening newscasts, to be the news director for a new 10 p.m. newscast. "Q13 Reports" began airing on January 18, 1998, initially running as a half-hour from Sunday to Thursday nights; the broadcast debuted without its lead anchor, Leslie Miller, a Canadian who was still awaiting a work permit and wound up not debuting until April. The station benefited from the decision of Paramount Stations Group to drop KSTW's competing newscast after 21 years on air in December 1998.

By early 1999, the station was beginning to contemplate an expansion into morning news. In January 2000, the morning show debuted, with Christine Chen—a former KSTW anchor who worked at KCPQ on a freelance basis for nearly a year—selected as its first anchor.

After adding a 9 p.m. newscast on KMYQ (now KZJO) in 2008, KCPQ expanded into early evening news in the 2010s with 4 and 5 p.m. programs added. A half-hour 11 p.m. newscast followed in 2014 when the revival of The Arsenio Hall Show was canceled. By 2021, KCPQ was producing 54 hours of locally produced newscasts weekly, with 11 hours each weekday. This was further expanded by the addition of a 6 p.m. news hour in January 2022. In April 2022, KCPQ relaunched its morning show as Good Day Seattle, adopting the Good Day title used by other Fox-owned stations.

Non-news programming
The station produces a local program on law enforcement and crime news, The Spotlight with David Rose, hosted by anchor David Rose, which airs every Friday at 11:00 p.m. The program began production in 2008 as Washington's Most Wanted, a local version of America's Most Wanted.

KCPQ became the local broadcast partner of the Seattle Seahawks in 2012, airing preseason games and team features; KING-TV, which lost the partnership to KCPQ, regained it in 2022. Beginning in 2014, KCPQ and KZJO became the broadcast home for locally televised Seattle Sounders FC matches. While all the matches were carried on KZJO, KCPQ aired two specials on the team each year.

In 2023, KCPQ and KZJO entered into a content partnership with the Seattle Kraken hockey team which includes a weekly show on the team, titled What's Kraken?.

Notable former on-air staff
Peter Alexander — reporter and anchor, later of NBC News
Christine Chen — anchor
Ron Corning — anchor
Stanley Kramer — movie host (1980s)
Don Poier — sports play-by-play (1980s; later voice of Vancouver/Memphis Grizzlies of NBA)

Technical information

Subchannels
The station's digital signal is multiplexed:

KCPQ carries two subchannels belonging to KONG, one of Seattle's two ATSC 3.0 television stations. In exchange, KCPQ is carried in ATSC 3.0 on the KONG multiplex.

KCPQ's main channel is also simulcast on KZJO's transmitter as channel 22.2, which together with the digital replacement translator at that site makes the signal more accessible to viewers using UHF-only antennas and to viewers who receive a stronger signal from its transmitter in the Capitol Hill area.

Analog-to-digital conversion
KCPQ shut down its analog signal, over VHF channel 13, on June 12, 2009, as part of the federally mandated transition from analog to digital television. The station's digital signal relocated from its pre-transition UHF channel 18 to VHF channel 13 for post-transition operations.

Translators
KCPQ is rebroadcast on four translators outside of the Seattle metropolitan area as well as a digital replacement translator co-sited with KZJO in Seattle:

 Aberdeen: 
 Centralia, Chehalis: 
 Chelan: 
 Seattle:  (RF 22)
 Wenatchee:

Notes

References

External links

CPQ
Fox network affiliates
Grit (TV network) affiliates
Ion Mystery affiliates
Buzzr affiliates
Fox Television Stations
Television channels and stations established in 1953
1953 establishments in Washington (state)
National Football League primary television stations
Major League Soccer over-the-air television broadcasters